Watson is a village in Effingham County, Illinois, United States. The population was 668 at the 2020 census. Watson is part of the Effingham, IL Micropolitan Statistical Area.

The village was named after George Watson, a railroad official.

Geography
Watson is located in south-central Effingham County at  (39.024538, -88.568394). Illinois Route 37 passes through the village, leading east  to U.S. Route 45 and south  to Interstate 57 at Exit 151.

Demographics

As of the census of 2000, there were 729 people, 245 households, and 191 families residing in the village. The racial makeup of the village was 98.22% White, 0.41% Native American, 0.14% Asian, 0.41% Pacific Islander, 0.69% from other races, and 0.14% from two or more races. Hispanic or Latino of any race were 1.10% of the population.

There were 245 households, out of which 51.4% had children under the age of 18 living with them, 57.1% were married couples living together, 14.7% had a female householder with no husband present, and 22.0% were non-families. 20.4% of all households were made up of individuals, and 7.8% had someone living alone who was 65 years of age or older.  The average household size was 2.98 and the average family size was 3.39.

In the village, the population was spread out, with 34.4% under the age of 18, 9.7% from 18 to 24, 34.8% from 25 to 44, 14.4% from 45 to 64, and 6.6% who were 65 years of age or older.  The median age was 28 years. For every 100 females, there were 93.9 males.  For every 100 females age 18 and over, there were 95.1 males.

The median income for a household in the village was $39,028, and the median income for a family was $42,159. Males had a median income of $28,125 versus $20,833 for females. The per capita income for the village was $13,000.  About 9.3% of families and 9.5% of the population were below the poverty line, including 12.6% of those under age 18 and 12.2% of those age 65 or over.

References

Villages in Effingham County, Illinois
Villages in Illinois